Milton Gonzalo Ramos (born 11 August 1994) is an Argentine professional footballer who plays as a left-back for Agropecuario.

Career
Ramos started his senior career with local club Brown. No matches arrived in league football for them, though he did make appearances against Villa Cubas and Defensa y Justicia in the Copa Argentina in April 2014. In January 2016, Ramos joined San Miguel in Primera C Metropolitana. He was selected forty-two times in his opening season, which ended with promotion to Primera B Metropolitana. Ramos departed on 30 June 2018 to sign for Almirante Brown. He made his debut against Estudiantes in August but didn't feature again in 2018. After almost terminating his contract in January, Ramos returned to the first-team in February 2019.

On 29 December 2021, Ramos signed with Primera Nacional club Club Agropecuario Argentino.

Career statistics
.

References

External links

1994 births
Living people
People from Adrogué
Argentine footballers
Association football defenders
Primera C Metropolitana players
Primera B Metropolitana players
Club Atlético Brown footballers
Club Atlético San Miguel footballers
Club Almirante Brown footballers
Club Agropecuario Argentino players
Sportspeople from Buenos Aires Province